The 1985–86 1. Slovenská národná hokejová liga season was the 17th season of the 1. Slovenská národná hokejová liga, the second level of ice hockey in Czechoslovakia alongside the 1. Česká národní hokejová liga. 10 teams participated in the league, and VTJ Michalovce won the championship. ZVL Žilina was relegated.

Regular season

References

External links
 Season on avlh.sweb.cz (PDF)

Czech
1st. Slovak National Hockey League seasons
2